Abdulrahman Ali Hassan Al-Aboud (born 1 June 1995) is a Saudi football player who plays as a winger for Al-Ittihad.

Honours

Al-Ittihad
Saudi Super Cup: 2022

References

External links 
 

1995 births
Living people
People from Dammam
Saudi Arabian footballers
Ettifaq FC players
Al-Orobah FC players
Ittihad FC players
Place of birth missing (living people)
Saudi First Division League players
Saudi Professional League players
Association football wingers
Saudi Arabia international footballers
2022 FIFA World Cup players